The mass media in Angola is primarily controlled by Angola's dominant political party, the People's Movement for the Liberation of Angola (MPLA).

Journalism 
The country's official news agency is the government-owned Angola Press Agency (ANGOP), founded in 1975, and formerly allied with the official news agency of the Soviet Union, the Telegraph Agency of the Soviet Union (TASS). "The press was nationalized in 1976."

Print 
Angolan newspapers include: 
 Agora
 Angolense
 O Apostolado
 A Capital
 Folha 8
 Jornal de Angola 
 Novo Jornal
 O Pais
 Semanário Angolense

Telecommunications

Television and radio 
TV Zimbo in a rival  privately owned channel in Angola. On December 16, 2015, a new private TV station, Palanca TV, began broadcasting from the South African satellite subscription TV provider DStv.

See also
Quem Quer Ser Milionário? (Angolan TV show)
Telephone numbers in Angola

References

Bibliography
 
  (Includes information about newspapers, radio, tv)

External links
 

 
Angola
Algeria